The Scythians or Scyths, and sometimes also referred to as the Classical Scythians and the Pontic Scythians, were an ancient Eastern Iranian equestrian nomadic people who had migrated from Central Asia to the Pontic Steppe in modern-day Ukraine and Southern Russia from approximately the 7th century BC until the 3rd century BC.

Skilled in mounted warfare, the Scythians replaced the Cimmerians as the dominant power on the Pontic Steppe in the 8th century BC. In the 7th century BC, the Scythians crossed the Caucasus Mountains and frequently raided West Asia along with the Cimmerians. After being expelled from West Asia by the Medes, the Scythians retreated back into the Pontic Steppe and were gradually conquered by the Sarmatians. In the late 2nd century BC, the capital of the largely Hellenized Scythians at Scythian Neapolis in the Crimea was captured by Mithridates VI and their territories incorporated into the Bosporan Kingdom. By the 3rd century AD, the Sarmatians and last remnants of the Scythians were overwhelmed by the Goths, and by the early Middle Ages, the Scythians and the Sarmatians had been largely assimilated and absorbed by early Slavs. The Scythians were instrumental in the ethnogenesis of the Ossetians, who are believed to be descended from the Alans.

After the Scythians' disappearance, authors of the ancient, mediaeval, and early modern periods used the name "Scythian" to refer to various populations of the steppes unrelated to them.

The Scythians played an important part in the Silk Road, a vast trade network connecting Greece, Persia, India and China, perhaps contributing to the prosperity of those civilisations. Settled metalworkers made portable decorative objects for the Scythians, forming a history of Scythian metalworking. These objects survive mainly in metal, forming a distinctive Scythian art.

Names

Etymology 

The ancient Persians meanwhile called the Scythians " who live beyond the Sea" in Old Persian and simply  in Ancient Egyptian, from which was derived the Graeco-Roman name .

Modern terminology 

The Scythians were part of the wider Scytho-Siberian world, stretching across the Eurasian Steppes of Kazakhstan, the Russian steppes of the Siberian, Ural, Volga and Southern regions, and eastern Ukraine. In a broader sense, Scythians has also been used to designate all early Eurasian nomads, although the validity of such terminology is controversial, and other terms such as "Early nomadic" have been deemed preferable.

Although the Scythians, Saka and Cimmerians were closely related nomadic Iranian peoples, and the ancient Babylonians, ancient Persians and ancient Greeks respectively used the names "Cimmerian," "Saka," and "Scythian" for all the steppe nomads, and early modern historians such as Edward Gibbon used the term Scythian to refer to a variety of nomadic and semi-nomadic peoples across the Eurasian Steppe, the name "Scythian" in contemporary modern scholarship generally refers to the nomadic Iranian people who dominated the Pontic Steppe from the 7th century BC to the 3rd century BC, while the name "Saka" is used specifically for their eastern members who inhabited the northern and eastern Eurasian Steppe and the Tarim Basin; and while the Cimmerians were often described by contemporaries as culturally Scythian, they formed a different tribe from the Scythians proper, to whom the Cimmerians were related, and who also displaced and replaced the Cimmerians in the Pontic Steppe.

The Scythians share several cultural similarities with other populations living to their east, in particular similar weapons, horse gear and Scythian art, which has been referred to as the Scythian triad. Cultures sharing these characteristics have often been referred to as Scythian cultures, and its peoples called Scythians. Peoples associated with Scythian cultures include not only the Scythians themselves, who were a distinct ethnic group, but also Cimmerians, Massagetae, Saka, Sarmatians and various obscure peoples of the East European Forest Steppe, such as early Slavs, Balts and Finnic peoples. Within this broad definition of the term Scythian, the actual Scythians have often been distinguished from other groups through the terms Classical Scythians, Western Scythians, European Scythians or Pontic Scythians.

Scythologist Askold Ivantchik notes with dismay that the term "Scythian" has been used within both a broad and a narrow context, leading to a good deal of confusion. He reserves the term "Scythian" for the Iranian people dominating the Pontic Steppe from the 7th century BC to the 3rd century BC. Nicola Di Cosmo writes that the broad concept of "Scythian" to describe the early nomadic populations of the Eurasian Steppe is "too broad to be viable," and that the term "early nomadic" is preferable.

History

Early history 

The Scythians originated in the region of the Volga-Ural steppes of Central Asia, possibly around the 9th century BC, as a section of the population of the Srubnaya culture, to which the Scythians themselves belonged, and continuity between the Scythians and the Srubnaya culture is suggested by both archaeological, genetic and anthropological evidence.

During the 9th to 8th centuries BC, some Scythian tribes had migrated westwards into the steppe adjacent to the northern shore of the Black Sea, which they occupied along with the Cimmerians, who were also a nomadic Iranian people closely related to the Scythians; and over the course of the 8th and 7th centuries BC, the Scythians migrated in several waves, becoming the dominant population of the Caucasian Steppe as part of a significant movement of the nomadic peoples of the Eurasian Steppe which started when another nomadic Iranian tribe closely related to the Scythians from eastern Central Asia, either the Massagetae or the Issedones, migrated westwards, forcing the early Scythians to the west across the Araxes river, following which the Scythians moved into the Caspian Steppe, where they conquered the territory of the Cimmerians and assimilated most of this latter people and displaced the rest, before settling in the area between the Araxes, the Caucasus and the Lake Maeotis.

The migration of the Scythians also displaced other populations, including some North Caucasian groups who retreated to the west and settled in Transylvania and the Hungarian Plain where they introduced Novocherkassk culture type swords, daggers, horse harnesses, and other objects: among these displaced populations from the Caucasus were the Sigynnae, who were displaced westward into the eastern part of the Pannonian Basin.

During this early migratory period, some groups of Scythians settled in Ciscaucasia and the Caucasus Mountains' foothills to the east of the Kuban river, where they settled among the native populations of this region, and did not migrate to the south into West Asia.

Under Scythian pressure, the Cimmerians migrated to the south along the coast of the Black Sea and reached Anatolia, and the Scythians in turn later expanded to the south, following the coast of the Caspian Sea and arrived in the Ciscaucasian steppes, from where they expanded into the region of present-day Azerbaijan, where they settled and turned eastern Transcaucasia into their centre of operations in West Asia until the early 6th century BC, with this presence in West Asia being an extension of the Scythian kingdom of the steppes. During this period, the Scythian kings' headquarters were located in the Ciscaucasian steppes, and contact with the civilisation of West Asia would have an important influence on the formation of Scythian culture. This presence in Transcaucasia influenced Scythian culture: the  sword and socketed bronze arrowheads with three edges, which are considered as typically "Scythian weapons," were of Transcaucasian origin and had been adopted by the Scythians during their stay in the Caucasus.

From their base in the Caucasian Steppe, during the period of the 8th to 7th centuries BC itself, the Scythians conquered the Pontic Steppe to the north of the Black Sea up to the Danube river, which formed the western boundary of Scythian territory onwards, although the Scythians may also have had access to the Wallachian and Moldavian plains. This expansion displaced another nomadic Iranian people related to the Scythians, the Agathyrsi, who were the oldest Iranian population to have dominated the Pontic Steppe, and who were pushed westwards by the Scythians, away from the steppes and from their original home around Lake Maeotis, after which the relations between the two populations remained hostile. In the Pontic Steppe, the Scythians spread throughout the territory of the Early Iranian populations of the Catacomb culture and intermarried with them.

The westward migration of the Scythians was accompanied by the introduction into the north Pontic region of articles originating in the Siberian Karasuk culture and which were characteristic of Early Scythian archaeological culture, consisting of cast bronze cauldrons, daggers, swords, and horse harnesses. Several smaller groups were likely also displaced by the Scythian expansion.

Beginning in this period, remains associated with the early Scythians started appearing within interior Europe, especially in the Thracian and Hungarian plains, although it is yet unclear whether these represent any actual Scythian migration into these regions or whether these arrived there through trade or raids.

West Asia 

During the earliest phase of their presence in West Asia, the Scythians under their king Išpakaia were allied with the Cimmerians, and the two groups, in alliance with the Medes, who were an Iranian people of West Asia to whom the Scythians and Cimmerians were distantly related, as well as the Mannaeans, were threatening the eastern frontier of the kingdom of Urartu and the then superpower of West Asia, the Neo-Assyrian Empire. These allied forces were defeated by the Assyrian king Esarhaddon, and Išpakaia was later killed in a retaliatory military campaign by Esarhaddon.

Išpakaia was succeeded by Bartatua, who sought a rapprochement with the Assyrians and married Esarhaddon's daughter Serua-eterat. Bartatua's marriage to Serua-eterat required that he would pledge allegiance to Assyria as a vassal, with the territories ruled by him would be his fief granted by the Assyrian king, thus making the Scythian presence in West Asia an extension of the Neo-Assyrian Empire, and henceforth, the Scythians remained allies of the Assyrian Empire, with Bartatua helping the Assyrians by defeating the state of Mannai and imposing Scythian hegemony over it.

The marital alliance between the Scythian king and the Assyrian ruling dynasty, as well as the proximity of the Scythians with the Assyrian-influenced Mannai and Urartu, placed the Scythians under the strong influence of Assyrian culture.

Bartatua was succeeded by his son with Serua-eterat, Madyes, who in 653 BC invaded the Medes who were engaged in a war against Assyria, thus starting a period which Herodotus of Halicarnassus called the "Scythian rule over Asia." Madyes soon expanded the Scythian hegemony to the state of Urartu, and, soon after 635 BC, with Assyrian approval and in alliance with the Lydians, the Scythians under Madyes entered Anatolia and defeated the Cimmerians. Scythian power in West Asia thus reached its peak under Madyes, with the territories ruled by the Scythians extending from the Halys river in Anatolia in the west to the Caspian Sea and the eastern borders of Media in the east, and from Transcaucasia in the north to the northern borders of the Neo-Assyrian Empire in the south.

By the 620s BC, the Assyrian Empire began unravelling after the death of Esarhaddon's son and successor, Ashurbanipal: in addition to internal instability within Assyria itself, Babylon revolted against the Assyrians in 626 BC under the leadership of Nabopolassar, and in 625 BC the Median king Cyaxares overthrew the Scythian yoke over the Medes by assassinating the Scythian leaders, including Madyes. Starting around 615 BC, the Scythians were operating as allies of Cyaxares and the Medes in their war against Assyria.

The Scythians were finally expelled from West Asia by the Medes in the 600s BC, after which they retreated to the Pontic Steppe. Some splinter Scythian groups nevertheless remained in West Asia and settled in Transcaucasia, and one group formed a kingdom in the area corresponding to modern-day Azerbaijan in eastern Transcaucasia. By the middle of the 6th century BC, the Scythians who had remained in West Asia had completely assimilated culturally and politically into Median society and no longer existed as a distinct group.

The Pontic Steppe 

After their expulsion from West Asia, and beginning in the later 7th and lasting throughout much of the 6th century BC, the majority of the Scythians, including the Royal Scythians, migrated into the Kuban Steppe around 600 BC, and from Ciscaucasia into the Pontic Steppe, which became the centre of Scythian power, and in the western Ciscaucasia, from where the Scythians, not large in number enough to spread throughout Ciscaucasia, instead took over the steppe to the south of the Kuban river's middle course; the northwards migration of the Scythians continued throughout the 6th century BC. Using the Pontic Steppe as their base, the Scythians often raided into the adjacent regions, with Central Europe being a frequent target of their raids. In many parts of their north Pontic kingdom, the Scythians established themselves as a ruling class over already present sedentary populations, including Thracians in the western regions, Maeotians on the eastern shore of Lake Maeotis, and later the Greeks on the north coast of the Black Sea.

Outside of the Pontic Scythian kingdom itself, some splinter Scythian groups formed the Vorskla and Sula-Donets groups of the Scythian Culture in the East European Forest Steppe.

Between 650 and 625 BC, the Scythians of the northern Pontic region came into contact with the Greeks, who were starting to create colonies in the areas under Scythian rule; the Greeks carried out thriving commercial ties with the sedentary peoples of the East European Forest Steppe who lived to the north of the Scythians, with the large rivers of eastern Europe which flowed into the Black Sea forming the main access routes to these northern markets. This process put the Scythians into permanent contact with the Greeks, and the relations between the latter and the Greek colonies remained peaceful.

In 513 BC, the king Darius I of the Persian Achaemenid Empire, which had succeeded the Median, Lydian, Egyptian, and Neo-Babylonian empires which the Scythians had once interacted with, carried out a campaign against the Pontic Scythians, with the reasons for this campaign being unclear. Darius's invasion was resisted by the Scythian king Idanthyrsus, and the results of this campaign were also unclear, with the Persian inscriptions themselves referring to the Pontic Scythians as having been conquered by Darius, while Greek authors instead claimed that Darius's campaign failed and from then onwards developed a tradition of idealising the Scythians as being invincible thanks to their nomadic lifestyle.

In the 5th century BC, the Scythians embarked on expansionist ventures, including in the west, where they raided south of the Danube into Thrace until the formation of the Thracian Odrysian kingdom blocked their advances, after which the Scythians formed an alliance with the Odrysians; as well as in the north, where they imposed their rule on the peoples of the forest steppe; and in the south, where they brought the Greek colonies on the northern shores of the Black Sea under their power.

The peak of the Scythian kingdom of the Pontic Steppe happened in the 4th century BC, at the same time when the Greek cities of the coast were prospering, and the relations between the two were mostly peaceful; the rule of the Spartocid dynasty in the Bosporan Kingdom was also favourable for the Scythians, and the Bosporan aristocracy had contacts with the Scythians. This period saw Scythian culture not only thriving, with most known Scythian monuments date from then, but also rapidly undergoing significant Hellenisation.

The most famous Scythian king of the 4th century BC was Ateas, whose rule started around the 360s BC, and under whom the Greek cities to the south of the Danube were brought under Scythian hegemony; Ateas's main activities in Thrace and south-west Scythia, such as his wars against the Triballi and the Histriani, attest of the power that the Scythians held to the south of the Danube in his time. Ateas initially allied with Philip II of Macedonia, but eventually this alliance fell apart and Ateas was killed during a war with the Macedonians in 339 BC.

In the 3rd century BC, the expansion in the northern Pontic region of the Sarmatians, who were another nomadic Iranian people related to the Scythians, as well as of the Thracian Getae, the Germanic Bastarnae and Sciri, and of the Celts, the Scythian kingdom disappeared from the Pontic Steppe and the Sarmatians replaced the Scythians as the dominant power of the Pontic Steppe, due to which the appellation of "Scythia" for the region became replaced by that of "" (European Sarmatia).

Scythia Minor

The remnants of the Scythians on the Pontic Steppe settled down in a series of fortified settlements located along the main rivers of the region. By then, these Scythians were no longer nomadic: they had become sedentary farmers and were Hellenised, and the only places where the Scythians could still be found by the 2nd century BC were in the s of Crimea and Dobrugea, as well as in the lower reaches of the Dnipro river.

By 50 to 150 AD, most of the Scythians had been assimilated by the Sarmatians. The remaining Scythians of Crimea, who had mixed with the Tauri and the Sarmatians, were conquered in the 3rd century AD by the Goths and other Germanic tribes who were then migrating from the north into the Pontic Steppe.

Legacy
In subsequent centuries, remaining Scythians and Sarmatians were largely assimilated by early Slavs. The Scythians and Sarmatians played an instrumental role in the ethnogenesis of the Ossetians, who are considered direct descendants of the Alans.

In Late Antiquity and the Middle Ages, the name "Scythians" was used in Greco-Roman and Byzantine literature for various groups of nomadic "barbarians" living on the Pontic-Caspian Steppe who were not related to the actual Scythians, such as the Huns, Goths, Ostrogoths, Turkic peoples, Pannonian Avars, Slavs, and Khazars. For example, Byzantine sources referred to the Rus' raiders who attacked Constantinople in 860 AD in contemporary accounts as "Tauroscythians" because of their geographical origin, and despite their lack of any ethnic relation to Scythians. Scythian descent claims have been frequent throughout history.

The New Testament includes a single reference to Scythians in Colossians 3:11.

Culture and society 

Since the Scythians did not have a written language, their non-material culture can only be pieced together through writings by non-Scythian authors, parallels found among other Iranian peoples, and archaeological evidence.

In a fragment from the comic writer Euphron quoted in Deipnosophistae poppy seeds are mentioned as a "food which the Scythians love."

Language 

The Scythians spoke a language belonging to the Scythian languages, most probably a branch of the Eastern Iranian languages. Whether all the peoples included in the "Scytho-Siberian" archaeological culture spoke languages from this family is uncertain.

The Scythian languages may have formed a dialect continuum: "Scytho-Sarmatian" in the west and "Scytho-Khotanese" or Saka in the east. The Scythian languages were mostly marginalised and assimilated as a consequence of the late antiquity and early Middle Ages Slavic and Turkic expansion. The western (Sarmatian) group of ancient Scythian survived as the medieval language of the Alans and eventually gave rise to the modern Ossetian language.

Lifestyle

The early Scythians tribes were nomadic pastoralists, and their lifestyle and customs were inextricably linked to their nomadic way of life; the Scythians were able to raise large herds of horses, cattle and sheep thanks to the abundance of grass growing in the steppe, while hunting was primarily done for sport and entertainment; among the more nomadic Scythian tribes, the women and children spent their time in wagons where they lived, while the men spent their lives on horseback and were trained as fighters and in archery since an early age. But by the time the Scythians were living in the Pontic Steppe, beginning in the 7th century BC, they had become semi-nomadic and practised both nomadism and farming, although the Scythian tribes living in the steppe zone remained primarily nomadic.

Barry Cunliffe describes the saddle as a 7th century BC Scythian invention. Preserved Scythian saddles consisted of two cushions attached to wooden saddle frames, kept in place by bands and straps. These Scythian saddles were elaborately adorned with wool and appliqué leather. Decorative wooden carvings were covered with gold foil. Scythians did not use stirrups, however Mike Loades notes that the Scythian saddles had four "ingenious" bolsters, one on each corner, which may have been used to stabilize the rider, describing this development as "arguably more significant than the stirrup".

Unlike the other Scythic peoples such as the Sarmatians, where women were allowed to go hunting, ride horses, learn archery and fight with spears just like the men, the society of the Scythians proper was patriarchal and Scythian women possessed little freedom. Due to the Scythians' nomadic pastoralist lifestyle, Scythian women nevertheless learnt to use weapons because they were in charge of the herds and the home when the men were away fighting in wars.

Wine was primarily consumed by the Scythian aristocracy during the earlier phase of their kingdom in the Pontic Steppe, and its consumption became more prevalent among the wealthier members of the populace in the Late Scythian period.

Clothing 

The Scythians wore clothing typical of the steppe nomads: the clothing of Scythian men included trousers and belts, they wore pointed caps during earlier periods, but they went bareheaded in later times; Scythian women wore long dresses and mantles decorated with triangular or round metallic plates, which were made of gold for wealthier women and of bronze for poorer women, and women belonging to the upper classes wore  cloaks over their dresses and a veil over their head.

Scythian men and women both wore golden and brazen jewellery: both wore bracelets made of silver or bronze wire and neckrings and torcs made of gold and whose terminals were shaped like animal figures or animal heads; necklaces worn by the Scythians were made of gold and semi-precious stone beads; men wore only one earring. Scythian men also grew their hair long and their beards to significant sizes.

Costume has been regarded as one of the main identifying criteria for Scythians. Women wore a variety of different headdresses, some conical in shape others more like flattened cylinders, also adorned with metal (golden) plaques.

Men and women wore long trousers, often adorned with metal plaques and often embroidered or adorned with felt appliqués; trousers could have been wider or tight fitting depending on the area. Materials used depended on the wealth, climate and necessity.

Men and women wore belts. Warrior belts were made of leather, often with gold or other metal adornments and had many attached leather thongs for fastening of the owner's gorytos, sword, whet stone, whip etc. Belts were fastened with metal or horn belt-hooks, leather thongs and metal (often golden) or horn belt-plates.

Scythian women used mirrors, and many Scythian women's burials contained Greek-made bronze mirrors. Bronze mirrors made in Pontic Olbia and whose handles were decorated with animal figures such as those of stags, panthers, and rams, were popular during the early Scythian periods.

Social organisation
Scythian society was stratified along class lines, and was composed of a tribal aristocracy and freemen. A rudimentary form of slavery existed in Scythia, and slaves were only used domestically by the Scythians.

The Scythians were monarchical, and the Scythians were ruled by tribal kings who held power over their respective tribes and who in turn owed allegiance to the king of the Royal Scythians, with the subject tribes paying tribute to the Royal Scythians and provided servants to the king and the Scythian tribal aristocracy. The power of the king among the Scythians was passed on hereditarily, although it was limited by an assembly of warriors. Royal power among the Scythians was considered as having been divinely ordained: this conception of royal power, which is well documented in the ritual symbols depicted on Late Scythian toreutics, was initially foreign to Scythian culture and originated in West Asia during the period of Scythian presence there in the 7th century BC. According to the Scythologists Askold Ivantchik and Mikhail Bukharin, the Scythians had been ruled by at least three dynasties, including that of Bartatua, that of Spargapeithes, and that of Ariapeithes. The historian and anthropologist Anatoly Khazanov instead suggested that the Scythians had been ruled by the same dynasty from the time of their stay in West Asia until the end of their kingdom in the Pontic Steppe.

By the 4th century BC, the Scythians had become organised into a rudimentary state after the king Ateas united all the Scythian tribes. This early state was itself based on the exploitation of the freemen within its social community.

The tribe of the Aroteres consisted of a large sedentary populace of Thracian origin over which ruled an Iranic Scythian ruling class. These Aroteres were a war-like people who were organised into small territorial units settled in who lived in open undefended settlements and strongholds covering between sixteen and twenty-four hectares, each possessing a large industrial centre, and which each functioned as industrial centres, attesting of the complexity of the Tiasmyn group's society. The earthworks of the Aroteres contained within them kurgan cemeteries, lasting from the 6th to 3rd centuries, that each included up to 400 kurgans where their inhabitants were buried, showing that these sites had dense populations. Among the Aroteres, the sedentary Thracians were cremated or buried, usually laid on their backs or sometimes crouched, in poorly furnished shaft tombs, while the Scythian ruling class were buried in large, almost square, underground burial chambers with timber sepulchres and wooden posts in each corner and in the centre supporting their rooves, with some having a corridor and steps cut from the ground, and whose grave goods included Greek pottery, weapons, and jewellery. During the Early Scythian period, the country of the Scythian Husbandsmen had close connections to the Greek colony of Pontic Olbia which ended during the late 5th century BC, when the Scythians imposed their rule over the Greek cities on the Black Sea shore.

The Callipidae also consisted of a large settled Thracian population with a Scythian ruling class who were considerably Hellenised. The Callipidae lived in open settlements and earthworks, and cultivated crops including wheat and millet, and also engaged in animal husbandry and fishing at sea. The Callipidae lived in rammed earth houses built on stone foundations, and they buried their dead in flat graves while their Scythian ruling class were buried in kurgans.

The class and social differences among the Scythians were reflected in Scythian art, which primarily represented concepts of importance for the aristocracy, but not for the commoner population.

Warfare 

The Scythians were a warlike people. When engaged at war, almost the entire adult population, including a large number of women, participated in battle. The Athenian historian Thucydides noted that no people in either Europe or Asia could resist the Scythians without outside aid.

The main Scythian weapon was the short composite recurve bow. The earliest known "Scythian type" arrowheads were found in the kurgan burial Arzhan-1, dated to the late ninth or early eighth century BCE. These arrowheads typically had either two or three blades and sockets with which to affix the arrowhead to the wooden or reed shaft of the arrow. The combination of the arrowheads' shape and short recurve bow used by the Scythians constituted the most powerful firing weapon of their time, which consequently led to their adoption by ancient West Asian armies during the late 7th century BCE. The  sword, which was a 50 to 70 centimetres short iron dagger, which whose haft was richly decorated, and shaft-hole war axes, which are also considered to be "typically Scythian" weapons, were also adopted by the Scythians from the Transcaucasian populations, and more specifically were derived from Georgian Bronze Age weapons. The  battle-pickaxes, which had bronze sockets and iron blades, were among the many types of war axes used by the Scythians. Other Scythian weapons included spears which were between 1.70 and 2.20 metres in length and had a bay leaf-shaped spearhead and sometimes a ferrule at the bottom, as well as lances, darts, lassoes, and slings.

The Scythians used leather or hide armour, although the aristocracy commonly used scale armour made of scales of iron, bronze, or bone sewn onto leather, which the Scythians had adopted from the West Asian peoples during the 7th century BC and made into a prevalent aspect of the Scythian culture of the northern Pontic region. Sometimes, instead of armour, the Scythians used battle-belts, which were made of scales sewn onto wide strips of either iron sheet, hide, or leather. The Scythians also small hide or wicker shields reinforced with iron strips, with the shields of Scythian aristocrats often being decorated with decorative central plaques. The Scythians sometimes also protected their horses, most especially their chests, with scale armour.

Other defensive armour used by the Scythians included "Kuban"-type cast bronze helmets made by the native Caucasian peoples in the 6th and early 5th centuries BC in western Ciscaucasia, which had openings for the face. By the 5th century BC, these Caucasian helmets had been replaced by Greek-made Attic helmets, and the Scythians also imported Greek-made greaves.

Scythians were particularly known for their equestrian skills, and their early use of composite bows shot from horseback. With great mobility, the Scythians could absorb the attacks of more cumbersome footsoldiers and cavalry, just retreating into the steppes. Such tactics wore down their enemies, making them easier to defeat. The Scythians were notoriously aggressive warriors. Ruled by small numbers of closely allied elites, Scythians had a reputation for their archers, and many gained employment as mercenaries. Scythian elites had kurgan tombs: high barrows heaped over chamber-tombs of larch wood, a deciduous conifer that may have had special significance as a tree of life-renewal, for it stands bare in winter.

The Greek historian Herodotus of Halicarnassus said that the Scythians scalped their enemies. Herodotus related that Scythian warriors would behead the enemies they defeated in battle and present the heads to their king to claim their share of the plunder. Then, the warrior would skin the head “by making a circular cut round the ears and shaking out the skull; he then scrapes the flesh off the skin with the rib of an ox, and when it is clean works it with his fingers until it is supple, and fit to be used as a sort of handkerchief. He hangs these handkerchiefs on the bridle of his horse, and is very proud of them. The best man is the man who has the greatest number.” A skull from an Iron Age cemetery in South Siberia shows evidence of scalping. It lends physical evidence to the practice of scalp taking by the Scythians living there.

Some Scythian-Sarmatian cultures may have given rise to Greek stories of Amazons. Graves of armed females have been found in southern Ukraine and Russia. David Anthony notes, "About 20% of Scythian-Sarmatian 'warrior graves' on the lower Don and lower Volga contained females dressed for battle as if they were men, a style that may have inspired the Greek tales about the Amazons."

Religion 

The religion of the Scythians was a variant of the Pre-Zoroastrian Iranian religion which differed from Zoroastrian and the post-Zoroastrian Iranian religions, and instead belonged to a more archaic stage of Indo-Iranian religious development than the Zoroastrian and Hindu systems. The use of cannabis to induce trance and divination by soothsayers was a characteristic of the Scythian belief system.

Our most important literary source on Scythian religion is Herodotus of Halicarnassus. According to him the leading deity in the Scythian pantheon was Tabiti, whom he compared to the Greek god Hestia. Tabiti was eventually replaced by Atar, the fire-pantheon of Iranian tribes, and Agni, the fire deity of Indo-Aryans. Other deities mentioned by Halicarnassus include Papaios, Api, Goitosyros/Oitosyros, Argimpasa and Thagimasadas, whom he identified with Zeus, Gaia, Apollo, Aphrodite and Poseidon, respectively. The Scythians are also said by Halicarnassus to have worshipped equivalents of Heracles and Ares, but he does not mention their Scythian names. An additional Scythian deity, the goddess Dithagoia, is mentioned in the a dedication by Senamotis, daughter of King Skiluros, at Panticapaeum. Most of the names of Scythian deities can be traced back to Iranian roots.

Halicarnassus states that Thagimasadas was worshipped by the Royal Scythians only, while the remaining deities were worshipped by all. He also states that "Ares," the god of war, was the only god to whom the Scythians dedicated statues, altars or temples. Tumuli were erected to him in every Scythian district, and both animal sacrifices and human sacrifices were performed in honor of him. At least one shrine to "Ares" has been discovered by archaeologists.

The Scythians had professional priests, but it is not known if they constituted a hereditary class. Among the priests there was a separate group, the Enarei, who worshipped the goddess Argimpasa and assumed feminine identities.

Scythian mythology gave much importance to myth of the "First Man," who was considered the ancestor of them and their kings. Similar myths are common among other Iranian peoples. Considerable importance was given to the division of Scythian society into three hereditary classes, which consisted of warriors, priests and producers. Kings were considered part of the warrior class. Royal power was considered holy and of solar and heavenly origin. The Iranian principle of royal charisma, known as khvarenah in the Avesta, played a prominent role in Scythian society. It is probable that the Scythians had a number of epic legends, which were possibly the source for Halicarnassus's writings on them. Traces of these epics can be found in the epics of the Ossetians of the present day.

In Scythian cosmology the world was divided into three parts, with the warriors, considered part of the upper world, the priests of the middle level, and the producers of the lower one.

Tribal divisions 

The Scythians were composed of a number of tribal units, including:
The Royal Scythians were the main Scythian tribe, and they were the ruling tribe of the whole of Scythia. The Royal Scythians and the Nomad Scythians were the only fully nomadic tribes within Scythia.
 the name  corresponds to the Young Avestan name , meaning “placed at the front.”
 the name  is the Greek form of the Scythian endonym , formed by the addition of the plural suffix  to the Scythian endonym 
 the Nomad Scythians, who lived to the west of the Royal Scythians, between the Inhul and the bend of the Dnipro, were a mixed Thracian and Iranic Scythian nomadic tribe. The Nomad Scythians and the Royal Scythians were the only fully nomadic tribes in Scythia.
 the Free Scythians, who were a tribe of mixed Scythian-Sauromatian origin, lived in the southeastern Pontic Steppe, between the port of Kremnoi and the Don or the Donets river.
The Alazones led semi-nomadic lives, with those of them who lived in the steppe being pastoral nomads and those who lived in the valleys of the Southern Buh and nearby rivers being farmers who cultivated wheat, onions, garlic, lentils and millet. The  were the southern neighbours of the Aroteres and, like them, might have been of mixed Thracian and Iranic origins. The  were themselves in turn the northern neighbours of the Callipidae.
Their neighbours to the north were the Baltic Neuri, and to the south were the Alazones.
 The Aroteres were a Thracian or Proto-Slavic population of Scythia who descended from the Late Bronze Age Sabatynivka Culture, over whom had established themselves an Iranian ruling class during the late 2nd millennium BC, and who later came under the rule of the Scythians during the 6th century BC.
 the Callipidae were a semi-nomadic population of Thracian origin who lived across a wide section of land adjacent to the shores of the Black sea ranging from the estuary of the Southern Buh river to the area of modern-day Odesa or even until the estuary of the Dnister. The western neighbours of the Callipadae across the Dnister river were Thracian tribe of the Getae in Bessarabia, while Thracian populations under Scythian rule lived on the coast.
 a tribe not named by the Greek authors lived on the north-west shore of Lake Maeotis, and corresponded to the archaeological "Obytichna 12 type" settlements.

The Royal Scythians were the dominant tribe within Scythia to whom all the other tribes were subjects, with the various tribes being each led by their own lords who were all subservient to the lord of the Royal Scythians, who was the Scythian king.

Herodotus of Halicarnassus relates that three main tribes of the Scythians descended from three sons of Targitaos:
 the Auchatae descended from Lipoxais
 the Catiari and Traspies descended from Arpoxais

Although scholars have traditionally treated the three tribes as geographically distinct, Georges Dumézil interpreted the divine gifts as the symbols of social occupations, illustrating his trifunctional vision of early Indo-European societies: the plough and yoke symbolised the farmers, the axe—the warriors, the bowl—the priests. The first scholar to compare the three strata of Scythian society to the Indian castes was Arthur Christensen. According to Dumézil, "the fruitless attempts of Arpoxais and Lipoxais, in contrast to the success of Colaxais, may explain why the highest strata was not that of farmers or magicians, but, rather, that of warriors."

There were few differences between the many Scythian tribes and tribal groupings in the early period of the Pontic Scythian kingdom, which later became more pronounced as these eventually conquered various native populations.

Neighbouring populations
The neighbours of the Scythians included:
 the Thracian Getae, who lived to the west of Scythia, across the Danube river.
 the Melanchlaeni and the Androphagi, who lived to the east of the middle Dnipro river, in the forest steppe bordering the territory of the Royal Scythians to the north. These populations were either of Scythic or of mixed Scythic and native origin.
 the Sauromatians, who lived to the east of the Scythians, in the steppe between the Don and the Volga, were another Scythic people. They were the immediate neighbours of the Royal Scythians to the east, across the Don river.
 the Neuri, who were a Baltic population of the region of the forest steppe corresponding to modern-day Belarus, lived to the north of the Aroteres. They corresponded to the Milograd culture.
 the Agathyrsi lived to the west of the Aroteres and of the Neuri.
 the Budini, to the east of the Neuroi and to the north of the Sauromatians, were one of the many Finno-Ugric populations living in the eastern forest steppe until the Ural Mountains.
 the Gelonians, to the north of the Sauromatians.
  the Maeotians lived on the eastern coast of Lake Maeotis.
 the Tauri lived in the Crimean Mountains.

Related populations
Herodotus of Halicarnassus and other classical historians listed quite a number of tribes who lived near the Scythians, and presumably shared the same general milieu and nomadic steppe culture, often called "Scythian culture," even though scholars may have difficulties in determining their exact relationship to the "linguistic Scythians". A partial list of these tribes includes:

 Abii
 Amardi
 Hamaxobii
 Huns
 Ordos Scythians
 Saka
 Indo-Scythians
 Apracharajas
 Massagetae
 Apasiacae
 Derbices
 Kambojas
 Amyrgians
 Dahae
 Parni
 Alans
 Sindi
 Spali
 Tapur
 Thyssagetae

Crafts 

Though a predominantly nomadic people for much of their history, the Scythians were skilled metalworkers. Knowledge of bronze working was present when the Scythian people formed, by the 8th century BC Scythian mercenaries fighting in the Near East had begun to spread knowledge of iron working to their homeland. Archeological sites attributed to the Scythians have been found to contain the remnants of workshops, slag piles, and discarded tools, all of which imply some Scythian settlements were the site of organized industry.

Scythian bronze-working products included large bronze semi-spheric cauldrons with truncated cones as their stands. These were decorated in cast and had either two or four animal-shaped handles on their rims. Such cauldrons were placed in burials along with deceased individuals, containing within them remains of horse and mutton bones, which were remnants of food for the deceased in the afterlife. Also manufactured by this bronze industry were socketed bronze finials which were placed at the top of poles and decorated with various animal figures.

The centre of early Scythian industry was located in the region of the Tiasmyn group of the Scythian culture, which corresponded the country of the Scythian Husbandsmen where an Iranic Scythian elite ruled over a sedentary Thracian population; the Scythians also obtained simple tools and ornamentations and some weapon types from the sedentary Thracians who lived in their kingdom, and who manufactured products such as pottery, woodwork, and weaving, as well as bronze metal-working made out of raw materials imported from Transylvania. By the Late Scythian period, its principal centre was at a site corresponding to present-day Kamianka-Dniprovska, where bog iron ores were smelted to produce iron, and various tools, ornaments, and weapons were made.

Art 

The art of the Scythians and related peoples of the Scythian cultures is known as Scythian art. It is particularly characterized by its use of the animal style.

The various groups of Scythian art across the Eurasian Steppe developed independently from each other: the populations of the Srubnaya and Andronovo cultures from which initially originated the early Scythians used solely geometric patterns on their pottery and cheek-pieces made of bone, and the art of the Scythians proper was developed under the influence of the art of West Asian cultures during the Scythian presence in West Asia and later under the influence of the naturalistic art of the inhabitants of the forested regions of Eastern Europe, as well as of Thracian and Greek art.

The art of the Scythians proper originated between 650 and 600 BC for the needs of the aristocracy of the Royal Scythians at the time when they ruled over large swathes of West Asia, with the objects of the Ziwiye hoard being the first example of this art. This art style was initially restricted to the Scythian upper classes, and the Scythian lower classes in both West Asia and the Pontic Steppe had not yet adopted it, with the latter group's bone cheek-pieces and bronze buckles being plain and without decorations, while the Pontic group were still using Srubnaya- and Andronovo-type geometric patterns. Scythian art continued to represent the interests of the Scythian aristocracy until the end of the Pontic Scythian kingdom, and depicted elements of prestige, the divine nature of royal power, and the cults of ancestral heroes and military valour; thus, Scythian art also reflected the class and cultural differences within Scythia which separated the aristocracy from the rest of the population.

In the earlier phases of the art of the Scythians proper, West Asian motifs dominated the earlier Srubnaya-inherited Scythian elements; Greek elements were later incorporated into this artistic tradition in the regions corresponding to modern-day Ukraine and Georgia; in addition to this, the art of the Scythians was also influenced by that of the peoples of the East European Forest Steppe. This Scythian art formed out of various influences later spread to the west, in the region which corresponds to present Romania, and eventually to Western Europe too, where it brought influences from Iranian and West Asian art into Celtic art.

Scythian animal style appears in an already established form Eastern Europe in the 8th century BC along with the Early Scythian archaeological culture itself. It bears little resemblance to the art of pre-Scythian cultures of the area. Some scholars suggest the art style developed under Near Eastern influence during the military campaigns of the 7th century BC, but the more common theory is that it developed on the eastern part of the Eurasian Steppe under Chinese influence. Others have sought to reconcile the two theories, suggesting that the animal style of the west and eastern parts of the steppe developed independently of each other, under Near Eastern and Chinese influences, respectively. Regardless, the animal style art of the Scythians differs considerable from that of peoples living further east.

Scythian animal style works are typically divided into birds, ungulates and beasts of prey. This probably reflects the tripatriate division of the Scythian cosmos, with birds belonging to the upper level, ungulates to the middle level and beasts of prey in the lower level.

Images of mythological creatures such a griffins are not uncommon in Scythian animal style, but these are probably the result of Near Eastern influences. By the late 6th century BC, as Scythian activity in the Near East was reduced, depictions of mythological creatures largely disappears from Scythian art. It, however, reappears again in the 4th century BC as a result of Greek influence.

Anthropomorphic depictions in Early Scythian art is known only from kurgan stelae. These depict warriors with large almond-shaped eyes and mustaches, often including weapons and other military equipment.

Since the 5th century BC, Scythian art changed considerably. This was probably a result of Greek and Persian influence, and possibly also internal developments caused by an arrival of a new nomadic people from the east. The changes are notable in the more realistic depictions of animals, who are now often depicted fighting each other rather than being depicted individually. Kurgan stelae of the time also display traces of Greek influences, with warriors being depicted with rounder eyes and full beards.

Scythian art of the 4th century BC shows additional Greek influence, and while the animal style was still in use, it appears that much Scythian art by this point was being made by Greek craftsmen on behalf of Scythians. Such objects are frequently found in aristocratic Scythian burials of the period. Depictions of human beings become more prevalent. Many objects of Scythian art made by Greeks are probably illustrations of Scythian legends. Several objects are believed to have been of religious significance.

By the late 3rd century BC, original Scythian art disappears through ongoing Hellenization. The creation of anthropomorphic gravestones continued, however.

Works of Scythian art are held at many museums and has been featured at many exhibitions. The largest collections of Scythian art are found at the Hermitage Museum in Saint Petersburg and the Museum of Historical Treasures of the Ukraine in Kyiv, while smaller collections are found at the Staatliche Antikensammlungen in Berlin, the Ashmolean Museum of Oxford, and the Louvre of Paris.

Trade

An important trade route existed in Scythia during the Early Scythian period which started in Pontic Olbia and followed the course of the Inhul river and crossed the Dnipro, after which it turned east until the country of the Gelonians and, after crossing the Don and the Volga, passed through the Ural Mountains and continued into Asia until the Altai Mountains. Gold was traded from eastern Eurasia until Pontic Olbia through this route, and the Scythian tradesmen went to the distant regions on its course to carry out commerce. The conquest of the north Pontic region by the Scythians and their imposition of a "" created the conditions of safety for traders which enabled the establishment of this route. This location provided to Pontic Olbia the important position of being a commercial and cultural centre in the northern Pontic region, and the city itself maintained friendly relations with the populations neighbouring it.

As a consequence of these flourishing trade relations, which were themselves possibly only thanks to the protection and cooperation of the Scythian kings, the Greek colonies on the northern shores of the Black Sea rapidly grew during the 6th century BC, and the Scythian upper classes were also able to significantly enrich themselves.

The relations between the Scythians and the Greek cities became more hostile during the 5th century BC, with the former destroying the latter's  and rural settlements and therefore their grain-producing hinterlands, with the result being that the Scythians instituted an economic policy under their control whereby the sedentary peoples of the forest steppe to their north became the primary producers of grain, which was then transported through the Buh and Dnipro rivers to the Greek cities to their south such as Tyras, Niconium and Pontic Olbia, from where the cities exported it to mainland Greece at a profit for themselves. This arrangement came to an end sometime between 435 and 400 BC, with the Greek cities regaining their independence and rebuilding their .

Another consequence of trade between the Greeks and the Scythians was that Greek art significantly influenced Scythian art and artistic preferences, and by the Late Scythian period most of the artwork in the Scythian tombs consisted of Scythian motifs and scenes representing Scythian life which had been done by Greek artisans.

During the 4th century BC, the Scythians became the middlemen in the trade routes supplying grains produced in the forest steppe and within Scythian itself to the Bosporan Kingdom, who in turn sold these to Greece itself. The Scythian royalty and aristocracy were able to derive immense revenue and profits from their role in these commercial activities.

Physical appearance 
 
In Histories, the 5th-century BC Greek historian Halicarnassus describes the Budini of Scythia as red-haired and grey-eyed. In the 5th century BC, Greek physician Hippocrates argued that the Scythians were light skinned as well as having a particularly high rate of hypermobility, to a point of affecting warfare. In the 3rd century BC, the Greek poet Callimachus described the Arismapes (Arimaspi) of Scythia as fair-haired. The 2nd-century BC Han Chinese envoy Zhang Qian described the Sai (Saka), an eastern people closely related to the Scythians, as having yellow (probably meaning hazel or green) and blue eyes. In the late 2nd century AD, the Christian theologian Clement of Alexandria says that the Scythians and the Celts have long auburn hair. The 2nd-century Greek philosopher Polemon includes the Scythians among the northern peoples characterised by red hair and blue-grey eyes. In the late 2nd or early 3rd century AD, the Greek physician Galen writes that Scythians, Sarmatians, Illyrians, Germanic peoples and other northern peoples have reddish hair. The fourth-century bishop Gregory of Nyssa wrote that the Scythians were fair skinned and blond haired. The 5th-century physician Adamantius, who often followed Polemon, describes the Scythians as fair-haired.

Archaeology 

Scythian archaeology can be divided into three stages:
 Early Scythian – from the mid-8th or the late 7th century BC to about 500 BC
 Classical Scythian or Mid-Scythian – from about 500 BC to about 300 BC
 Late Scythian – from about 200 BC to the mid-3rd century AD, in the Crimea and the Lower Dnipro, by which time the population was settled.

Archaeological remains of the Scythians include kurgan tombs (ranging from simple exemplars to elaborate "Royal kurgans" containing the "Scythian triad" of weapons, horse-harness, and Scythian-style wild-animal art), gold, silk, and animal sacrifices, in places also with suspected human sacrifices. Mummification techniques and permafrost have aided in the relative preservation of some remains. Scythian archaeology also examines the remains of cities and fortifications.

See also 
 Scythia
 Andronovo culture 
 Scythian art
 Scythian languages
 Eurasian nomads
 Nomadic empire
 Pre-Achaemenid Scythian kings of Iran
 Early Slavs

Notes

References

Early sources

Modern sources

Further reading 

 
 
 
 
 
 
 
 
 
 

Scythians
Historical Iranian peoples
Iranian nomads
Ancient history of Ukraine
Ancient Russia
Tribes described primarily by Herodotus
1st millennium BC